Adriano Pella (30 November 1945 – 27 May 2013) was an Italian racing cyclist. He rode in the 1971 Tour de France as well as in six editions of the Giro d'Italia.

Major results
1970
 1st Stage 8a Paris–Nice
 7th Trofeo Baracchi (with Celestino Vercelli)
 8th Trofeo Matteotti
 9th Giro di Toscana
1971
 5th Trofeo Matteotti
1974
 6th Gran Premio Città di Camaiore
 10th Giro del Friuli
1975
 4th Coppa Sabatini
 7th Trofeo Matteotti

Grand Tour general classification results timeline

References

External links
 

1945 births
2013 deaths
Italian male cyclists
Sportspeople from the Province of Biella
Cyclists from Piedmont